The Institute of Industrial and Systems Engineers (IISE), formerly the Institute of Industrial Engineers, is a professional society dedicated solely to the support of the industrial engineering profession and individuals involved with improving quality and productivity.

The institute was founded in 1948 as the American Institute of Industrial Engineers. In  1981, the name was changed to Institute of Industrial Engineers in order to reflect its international membership base. The name was changed again to the present Institute of Industrial and Systems Engineers in 2016 to reflect the changing scope of engineers working with large-scale, integrated systems.

Members include both college students and professionals. IISE holds annual regional and national conferences in the United States. IISE is headquartered in the United States in Peachtree Corners, Georgia, a suburb located northeast of Atlanta.:

Student Chapters 

An student chapter is a group of industrial engineer students who have the initiative to be leaders among their classmates. Every college or university that offers an Industrial Engineer degree program is eligible to have an IISE student chapter. Students need to send a formal application to the organization and once it is approved, they will be assigned with a chapter number and a formal recognition. Then, a Faculty Advsisor and Chapter Officers are elected. They will be the leaders for their department during an academic period, and have the challenge and responsibility to engage their classmates with learning and networking opportunities.

Board of Members 

An Officer Slate has to be submitted by each Student Chapter at the beginning of the academic period. The main requirement to be part of the Board is paying for IISE's membership. Additionally, other requirements such as a minimum 3.00/4.00 GPA and extracurricular involvement are asked. Below, the structure for the Board is presented with their main duties:

 Student Chapter President: Strategic planning sessions to determine chapter goals, strategies and activities with all the team. Elaborate an Operations Plan and ensure activities are being done. 
 Student Chapter Vice President: Oversee, coordinate and support the president with activities and board meetings. Compile information for Chapters Performance Report
 Finance Coordinator: Prepare annual budget and maintain chapter bank accounts balanced.
 Marketing Coordinator: Promote all activities among the industrial engineering community. Manage Instagram, Facebook and LinkedIn accounts 
 Mentor Coordinator: Contact new members to welcome them to the chapter as well as motivate new students to join
 Logistics Coordinator: Organize the schedule for every month. Develop strategies to efficiently accomplish every activity. 
 Congress Director: Coordinate with other chapters and countries networking activities

Benefits 

1. Meeting other ISE students and IISE professional members: An IISE chapter provides a learning environment, full of opportunities to generate contacts with other students.

2. Programs and Events: IISE is constantly holding events, workshops and conferences. Students can participate in annual events as well as in paper and presentations competitions.

3. Developing Leadership Skills: Officers and members are constantly being leaders, and they strengthen their soft and organizational skills.

Publications
IISE publishes two magazines and five technical journals.

The institute's flagship journal is IISE Transactions, which publishes papers that are grounded in science and mathematics, as well as motivated by engineering applications. The Engineering Economist is a quarterly refereed journal dealing with capital investments. IISE Transactions on Healthcare Systems Engineering focuses on research  in health systems. The Journal of Enterprise Transformation contains research related to enterprise transformation. IISE Transactions on Occupational Ergonomics and Human Factors is devoted to ergonomics and human factors research and techniques.

Industrial Management, the publication of the institute's  Society for Engineering and Management System, is a quarterly magazine on engineering management topics, The award-winning member magazine is ISE (formerly Industrial Engineer) and is published monthly.

References

External links 
 
IISE history
ISE (formerly Industrial Engineer) magazine

See also

Related topics
 
 
 
 
  
  
 
 
 
 
 
 
  
 
  

Organizations established in 1948
Engineering societies based in the United States
Industrial engineering
Organizations based in Georgia (U.S. state)